This is a list of school districts in Alabama.

Alabama
School districts
School districts